Novokuruchevo (Yañı Qoros) is a rural locality (a selo) in Starokuruchevsky Selsoviet, Bakalinsky District, Bashkortostan, Russia. The population was 72 as of 2010. There is 1 street.

Geography 
Novokuruchevo is located 25 km southeast of Bakaly (the district's administrative centre) by road. Akhmerovo is the nearest rural locality.

References 

Rural localities in Bakalinsky District